Mrs. Wiggs of the Cabbage Patch is a 1919 silent American comedy-drama film produced by Famous Players-Lasky Corporation and distributed through Paramount Pictures. Directed by Hugh Ford, the film stars Marguerite Clark and is based on the 1904 Broadway play by Anne Crawford Flexner, which itself is taken from the novel of the same name by Alice Hegan Rice.

The picture survives and is preserved at the Library of Congress, one of Clark's few surviving silent films.

Plot
As described in a film magazine, Lovey Mary (Clark) is an inmate of an orphanage who runs away a little boy with whom she has become strongly attached. She finds refuge on a rainy night with Mrs. Wiggs (Carr), a mother of five who lives in a wretched settlement known as the Cabbage Patch. Mrs. Wiggs feeds and shelters them, and lies to a sheriff looking to return them to the orphanage. There are a series of interactions with the amusing characters that live in the Cabbage Patch with brings about the growth and improvement in Mary. It is through Mary that the child she has been mothering becomes legitimate and the whole family obtains prosperity.

Cast
 Marguerite Clark as Lovey Mary
 Mary Carr as Mrs. Nancy Wiggs
 Vivia Ogden as Miss Tabitha Hazy
 Gladys Valerie as Maggie Duncan
 Gareth Hughes as Billy Wiggs
 Jack McLean as Dick Morgan (credited as Jack MacLean)
 Maud Hosford as Mrs. 'Phroney Morgan
 Lawrence Johnson as Tommy
 May McAvoy as Australy Wiggs

uncredited
Anita Brown as Mrs. Schultz
Mary Davis as Mrs. Eichorn
Lola Hernandez as Asia Wiggs
Robert Milasch as Hiram Stubbins
Marian Stewart as Baby Wiggs
Wanda Valle as Europena Wiggs

Other adaptations
The 1919 film is the second film adaptation of the novel. The first film version was released in 1914, starring Blanche Chapman. The third version was released in 1934 and stars Pauline Lord while the fourth version was released in 1942 and stars Fay Bainter.

The book was also adapted into a radio series which aired from 1935 to 1938.

References

External links
 
 
 the film available from Alpha/Oldies
Mrs. Wiggs of the Cabbage Patch 1919 (YouTube)
Lantern slide (Wayback Machine)
Stills at silenthollywood.com

1919 films
1919 comedy-drama films
1910s English-language films
American silent feature films
American black-and-white films
Films directed by Hugh Ford
American films based on plays
Films based on American novels
Famous Players-Lasky films
Paramount Pictures films
Films based on adaptations
Films based on works by Alice Hegan Rice
1910s American films
Silent American comedy-drama films